Anna is the debut solo album by That Dog's Anna Waronker, released June 4, 2002.

Track listing

References

External links

Oglio Records albums
2002 debut albums
Anna Waronker albums